The Scottish Qualifications Certificate (SQC) is the successor to the Scottish Certificate of Education and the Record of Education and Training, and is the main educational qualification awarded to students in secondary, further, and vocational education.  The SQC is awarded by the Scottish Qualifications Authority.  It forms part of the wider array of qualifications available in the Scottish education system, including Scottish Vocational Qualifications, Higher National Certificates and Higher National Diplomas.  Each level is fully integrated with the Scottish Credit and Qualifications Framework and the three upper levels are awarded UCAS Tariff Points.

The SQC recognises performance in National Qualifications, Higher National Qualifications, Scottish Vocational Qualifications and other awards.  As it is not part of the National Qualifications Framework of England, Wales and Northern Ireland, it is not available to state schools there, but students from other nations do study for the qualification.

National Qualifications Levels and grades
National Qualifications are available at several levels, with the possible grades and rough GCSE and A-level equivalent shown:

See also

 Education in Scotland
 Learning and Teaching Scotland
 Scottish Government

External links

 Scottish Qualifications Authority
 Scottish Credit and Qualifications Framework

School qualifications
Educational qualifications in Scotland
Vocational education in Scotland